Rosalind Claire Love (born 29 June 1966) is a British historian, medievalist, and academic. She has been a Fellow of Robinson College, Cambridge since 1993, and Elrington and Bosworth Professor of Anglo-Saxon in the Department of Anglo-Saxon, Norse and Celtic at the University of Cambridge since 2019.

Early life and education
Love was born on 29 June 1966 in Chipping Sodbury, Gloucestershire, England. She was educated at Haberdashers' Monmouth School for Girls, an independent school in Monmouth, Wales. She studied classics and then Anglo-Saxon, Norse, and Celtic at St John's College, Cambridge, graduating with a Bachelor of Arts (BA) degree in 1984. She undertook postgraduate research in Anglo-Saxon, Norse, and Celtic, and submitted her doctoral thesis "The texts, transmission and circulation of some eleventh-century Anglo-Latin saints' lives" in 1993.

Academic career
In 1993, Love was elected a fellow of Robinson College, Cambridge. In 2000, she also became a lecturer in the Department of Anglo-Saxon, Norse and Celtic, University of Cambridge. She was promoted to senior lecturer in 2008 and made Reader in Insular Latin in 2012. She was Head of Department in 2015. In November 2018, it was announced that she would be the next Elrington and Bosworth Professor of Anglo-Saxon, in succession to Simon Keynes: she took up the chair on 1 October 2019. 

Love is an editorial board member of the Richard Rawlinson Center Series for Anglo-Saxon Studies, an imprint of de Gruyter, an editor for the Oxford University Press imprint Oxford Medieval Texts, and the publications secretary for the Henry Bradshaw Society.

Love has published on Anglo-Latin medieval hagiography (saints' lives) and chronicle writing. With Simon Keynes, she examined the Vita Ædwardi regis, an 11th-century text, which gives an account of the reign of King Edward the Confessor.

Personal life
Love has been married to Nicholas Moir, an Anglican priest, since 1998, and they have two children.

Selected works 
 
 
 Love, Rosalind (2005). "The Life of St Wulfsige of Sherborne by Goscelin of Saint-Bertin: a New Translation with introduction, appendix and notes". In Barker, Katherine; Hinton, David; Hunt, Alan (eds.). St Wulfsige and Sherborne. Oxford, UK: Oxbow Books. pp. 98–123. ISBN 978-1-84217-175-2.
 Love, Rosalind C. and Simon Keynes (2009) "Earl Godwine's ship". Anglo-Saxon England, Volume 38, pp. 185 - 223 https://doi.org/10.1017/S0263675109990044

References 

Living people
Medievalists
Book editors
Elrington and Bosworth Professors of Anglo-Saxon
Fellows of Robinson College, Cambridge
1966 births
People educated at Haberdashers' Monmouth School for Girls
Alumni of St John's College, Cambridge